Erwin Moser (23 January 1954 – 12 October 2017) was an Austrian children's and young adult books' author and illustrator. He is best known for his children's book series Manuel & Didi, which he illustrated himself, using a text comics format.

Awards and recognition
 1987 Owl Prize for Der Rabe im Schnee (The Raven in the Snow)
 1992 Rattenfänger-Literaturpreis (Pied Piper Literature Prize) for Der Rabe Alfons (Alfons the Raven)
 2013 Goldene Verdienstzeichen des Landes Wien (Golden Order of Merit of the Province of Vienna)....

Bibliography
 Jenseits der großen Sümpfe, 1980
 The City meets the Country (Compiled by Hans-Joachim Gelberg, Published by Beltz & Gelberg), 1980
 Großvaters Geschichten oder das Bett mit den fliegenden Bäumen, 1981
 Ein Käfer wie ich – Erinnerungen eines Mehlkäfers aus dem Burgenland, 1982
 Der Mond hinter den Scheunen – Eine lange Fabel von Katzen, Mäusen und Ratzen, 1982
 Die Geschichte von Philip Schnauze, 1982
 Mein Baumhaus, 1983
 Ich und der Wassermann – Wahre Traumgeschichten, 1983
 Der Roboter Max und andere merkwürdige Geschichten, 1983
 Das verzauberte Bilderbuch, 1984
 Der einsame Frosch – Fabelhafte Geschichten, 1984
 Eisbär, Erdbär und Mausbär, 1984
 Die fliegende Schnecke & andere seltsame Geschichten, 1984
 Winzig, der Elefant, 1985
 Geschichten aus der Flasche im Meer, 1985
 Das Katzen-ABC, 1985
 Das kleine Mäusealbum, 1985
 Ein aufregender Tag im Leben von Franz Feldmaus, 1986
 Katzenkönig Mauzenberger, 1986
 Paulis Traumreise, 1986
 Der Rabe im Schnee – Gute-Nacht-Geschichten, 1986
 Der Bärenschatz – Die Abenteuer von Manuel, dem Mäuserich, und seinem Freund Didi, 1986
 Der Tintenfisch sitzt in der Tinte, 1987
 Manuel & Didi – Die Baumhütte – Kleine Mäuseabenteuer, 1987
 Manuel & Didi – Der fliegende Hut – Kleine Mäuseabenteuer, 1987
 Manuel & Didi – Der grosse Pilz – Kleine Mäuseabenteuer, 1987
 Manuel & Didi – Der Schneemensch – Kleine Mäuseabenteuer, 1987
 Der Dachs schreibt hier bei Kerzenlicht – Kleine Tierkunde, 1987
 Winzig geht in die Wüste, 1987
 Winzig sucht die Elefanten, 1988
 Das Haus auf dem fliegenden Felsen, 1988
 Edi Nußknacker und Lili Weißwieschnee, 1988
 Ein seltsamer Gast – Gute-Nacht-Geschichten, 1988
 Tierisches von A bis Z, 1988
 Wer küsst den Frosch?, 1988
 Wie geht’s dem Schwein?, 1988
 Winzig findet seine Eltern, 1989
 Die drei kleinen Eulen und sieben andere Geschichten, 1989
 Das Fabulierbuch, 1989
 Sultan Mudschi – Gute-Nacht-Geschichten, 1989
 Gute Nacht, kleiner Igel, 1989
 Guten Tag, lieber Bär!, 1989
 Was macht der Bär?, 1989
 Wo schläft die Maus?, 1989
 König Löwe, 1990
 Guten Morgen, Herr Kater!, 1990
 Guten Abend, Frau Eule!, 1990
 Der Rabe Alfons, 1990
 Diese Maus heißt Friederich, 1990
 Das schöne Bärenleben, 1990
 Die Wüstenmäuse, 1990
 Der Bär und seine Freunde, 1991
 Der glückliche Bär, 1991
 Die Geschichten von der Maus, vom Frosch und vom Schwein, 1991
 Die Geschichte von der Gehmaschine, 1991
 Der Siebenschläfer – Gute-Nacht-Geschichten, 1991
 Dicker Kater Kasimir, 1992
 Kleine Katze Nina, 1992
 Der karierte Uhu – Gute-Nacht-Geschichten, 1992
 Schlaf gut, Murmeltier!, 1992
 Hallo, Eichhörnchen!, 1992
 Manuel & Didi – Der blaue Turban – Kleine Mäuseabenteuer im Sommer, 1992
 Manuel & Didi – Der Lehnstuhl – Kleine Mäuseabenteuer, 1992
 Manuel & Didi – Das Maisauto – Kleine Mäuseabenteuer im Herbst, 1992
 Manuel & Didi – Die Schneekatze – Kleine Mäuseabenteuer im Winter, 1992
 Koko mit dem Zauberschirm, 1992. Auch als Figurentheater im Figurentheater LILARUM (Uraufführung June 1999)
 Koko und der weiße Vogel, 1993. Auch als Figurentheater im Figurentheater LILARUM (Uraufführung November 2000)
 Koko und seine Freundin Kiri, 1993. Auch als Figurentheater im Figurentheater LILARUM (Uraufführung May 2001)
 Winzig – Das große Buch vom kleinen Elefanten, 1993
 Joschi Tintenkatz, 1993
 Der Mäusezirkus, 1993
 Wunderbare Bärenzeit, 1993
 Koko und der fliegende Teppich, 1994
 Der glückliche Biber, 1994
 Das Findelkind – Gute-Nacht-Geschichten, 1994
 Pepe Pinguin, 1994
 Violetta, die Maus, 1994
 Die Igelkinder, 1995
 Das große Fabulierbuch, 1995
 Kleine Katzenwelt, 1995
 Das kleine Kürbisboot, 1995
 Bolo, der kleine Elefant, 1996
 Die fliegende Kiste, 1996
 Mario der Bär – Gute-Nacht-Geschichten, 1996
 Klitzekleine Schneegeschichten, 1996
 Die Maus im All, 1996
 Die geheimnisvolle Eule – Gute-Nacht-Geschichten, 1997
 Die Mäusepiraten, 1997
 Max der Roboter, 1997
 Traumboot – Ausgewählte Gute-Nacht-Geschichten, 1997
 Das Mäuse-ABC, 1998
 Hugo der Hamster, 1998
 Mondballon – Ausgewählte Gute-Nacht-Geschichten, 1998
 Die Abenteuer von Manuel und Didi – Frühlingsgeschichten, 1998
 Die Abenteuer von Manuel und Didi – Sommergeschichten, 1998
 Manuel & Didi – Das große Buch der kleinen Mäuseabenteuer, 1998
 Die Abenteuer von Manuel und Didi – Herbstgeschichten, 1999
 Die Abenteuer von Manuel und Didi – Wintergeschichten, 1999
 Manuel & Didi – Das zweite große Buch der kleinen Mäuseabenteuer, 1999
 Manuel & Didi helfen den Krähen, 1999
 Manuel & Didi und die Schildkröte, 1999
 Der Mäusejaguar – Gute-Nacht-Geschichten, 1999
 Konrad der Schneemensch, 1999
 Das Weihnachtsgeschenk, 1999
 In allem ist eine Geschichte verborgen, 2000
 Wunderbare Bärenzeit, 2000
 Der sanfte Drache – Gute-Nacht-Geschichten, 2001
 Guten Morgen, Herr Kater, 2001
 Die Erdmaus und der Regenschirm, 2002
 Plim der Clown – Gute-Nacht-Geschichten, 2002
 Eddy und seine Freunde, 2005
 So im Schatten liegen möcht ich, 2006
 Das große Buch von Koko und Kiri, 2010
 Wo wohnt die Maus? Frühlings- und Sommergeschichten, 2011

References

External links

 
 Beltz.de
 Residenzverlag.at

1954 births
2017 deaths
Austrian children's writers
Austrian children's book illustrators
Austrian illustrators
Austrian comics artists
Writers from Vienna
Austrian male writers